Throughout Chinese history, China had multiple periods of golden age. Well-Governed Era).

List of Chinese golden ages
This is a list of the golden ages in the history of China, sorted by dynasty.

See also
 Chinese Century
 History of China
 Pax Sinica
 Tributary system of China

References

 
Historiography of China